Novy Shagirt is a rural locality (a village) in Shagirtskoye Rural Settlement, Kuyedinsky District, Perm Krai, Russia. The population was 47 as of 2010. There is 1 street.

Geography 
Novy Shagirt is located 32 km northwest of Kuyeda (the district's administrative centre) by road. Gozhan is the nearest rural locality.

References 

Rural localities in Kuyedinsky District